St Albans F.C., sometimes reported as St Alban's, was an English association football club based in London, named after a local church.  The club played at Forest Gate and used the Princess Alice public house for its facilities.

The club's first reported match was against Grey Friars in October 1877 and the club lost all nine of the matches it played in its first season.  In 1879-80 however the club won 9 of its 16 matches and in 1880-81 it won 7 out of 18.

The club entered the FA Cup twice, in 1880-81 and 1881-82, losing both times in the first round.

Colours
The club wore navy and white.

References

Defunct football clubs in England
Association football clubs established in 1877
Association football clubs disestablished in 1882
Defunct football clubs in London